is a Japanese fashion model and actress. She was born in the Mie prefecture. Her career began as a model for the magazine CANDy in 2002. She was also the face model for Miyako Kajiro, a video game character from the 2004 video game Siren.

Filmography
 Warau Mikaeru (2006)
 Aoi uta - Nodo jiman Seishun hen (2006)
 K-tai Investigator 7 (2008)
  (2010)
  (2011)

References

External links
 

1989 births
Living people
Actors from Mie Prefecture
Japanese child actresses
Japanese female models
Japanese film actresses
Japanese television actresses
Models from Mie Prefecture
20th-century Japanese actresses
21st-century Japanese actresses